The draft history of the Phoenix Suns.

Key

Selections

Footnotes

References

 
National Basketball Association draft
draft history